The Supreme National Committee (Naczelny Komitet Narodowy, NKN) was a quasi-government for the Poles in Galicia, Austro-Hungarian Empire, from 1914 to 1917.

History
Created on 16 August 1914, the Supreme National Committee replaced the Temporary Commission of Confederated Independence Parties (Komisja Tymczasowa Skonfederowanych Stronnictw Niepodległościowych) and the Central National Committee (Centralny Komitet Narodowy), gaining support from Polish conservatives and National Democrats; but over time it lost much of its early support, especially due to its strong pro-Austrian stance, and was replaced in 1917 by a Regency Council.

Key members
 Presidents: Juliusz Leo; Władysław Leopold Jaworski; Leon Biliński
 Military: Władysław Sikorski; Józef Piłsudski
 Other: Tadeusz Cieński.

1914 establishments in Austria-Hungary
1917 disestablishments in Poland
Poland in World War I
Political history of Poland
Polish independence organisations